A superglass is a phase of matter which is characterized (at the same time) by superfluidity and a frozen amorphous structure.

J.C. Séamus Davis theorised that frozen helium-4 (at 0.2 K and 50 Atm) may be a superglass.

Notes

References
Superglass could be new state of matter  (subscription required)
A new quantum glass phase: the superglass
Phys. Rev. Lett. Vol.101, 8th Aug 2008

Superfluidity
Phases of matter
Glass physics